Mid Valley School District is a small, suburban, school district located in Lackawanna County, Pennsylvania, comprising the boroughs of Olyphant, Dickson City, and Throop. According to 2000 federal census data, it serves a resident population of 15,193. By 2010, the district's population increased to 15,304 people. The educational attainment levels for the Mid Valley School District population (25 years old and over) were 89.9% high school graduates and 20.8% college graduates. The district is one of 12 public school districts in Lackawanna County and one of the 500 public school districts of Pennsylvania.

According to the Pennsylvania Budget and Policy Center, 49.2% of the district's pupils lived at 185% or below the Federal Poverty level as shown by their eligibility for the federal free or reduced price school meal programs in 2012. In 2009, the Mid Valley School District residents’ per capita income was $17,167, while the median family income was $42,468. In Lackawanna County, the median household income was $43,673. In the Commonwealth, the median family income was $49,501 and the United States median family income was $49,445, in 2010. By 2013, the median household income in the United States rose to $52,100.

Mid Valley School District operates two schools: Mid Valley Elementary Center (grades Pre-K to 6) and Mid Valley Secondary Center (grades 7–12). High school students may choose to attend Career Technology Center of Lackawanna County for training in the construction and mechanical trades. The Northeastern Educational Intermediate Unit, IU19, provides the district with a wide variety of services like specialized education for disabled students and hearing, speech and visual disability services and professional development for staff and faculty.

Student Staff
Student Council

-[Standby]

-[Standby]

-[Standby]

History
Prior to 1969 each borough within the district had operated its own schools. The Pennsylvania legislature enacted the school district Reorganization Act of 1961, the school district Reorganization Act of 1963, and the school district Reorganization Act of 1968.  Due to dwindling populations because of the decline of anthracite mining in the region, in accordance with this legislation, the schools of the boroughs combined to form the Mid Valley School District for the 1969–1970 school year. The name picked for the district "Mid Valley" comes from the fact that the three towns are considered to be in the middle of the Lackawanna Valley and the area of the three towns (along with Blakely, Jessup, sometimes Archbald) are often referred to as the Mid Valley Region.

For the 1969–70 school year and throughout most of the 1970s, the district population utilized the former Olyphant Junior High School as the Mid-Valley Senior High School for students in grades 10 through 12, and the former Dickson City Junior High School as the Mid-Valley Junior High School for students in grades 7 through 9.  There was an elementary school for students in kindergarten through sixth grade in each borough. Soon afterward sixth grade students from Throop began to attend classes in Olyphant.  Problems ranging from lack of heat in the winter months, and structural problems plagued the new district throughout much of the first decade.

In the spring of 1977, while plans for a new junior-senior high school for grades 7–12 on Franko Street in Throop were on hold, the Olyphant Elementary School and the Dickson City Elementary School were condemned by the Pennsylvania Department of Labor and Industry because of violations of the Fire and Panic Law.  The displaced elementary school students then attended classes on a full-time basis in the junior high school.  The junior high school students and the senior high school students used the senior high school building on split sessions.  Soon afterward the Dickson City Elementary School (former Dickson City High School) was destroyed by fire.  For the 1978–79 school year, district rented the former St. Patrick's School in Olyphant and used it for seventh and eighth grade students.  The secondary students were no longer attending classes on split sessions.  The district operated in that mode until the opening of the new Mid Valley Secondary Center on Underwood Road in Throop in the fall of 1981.

1981-1989 
In September 1981, the new high school building was finally opened at its present location at 52 Underwood Road in Throop. The new building housed grades 7 – 12 and was named Mid Valley Secondary Center. With the opening of the new building, Mid Valley Intermediate Center (grades 4 – 6) moved into the building formerly occupied by the senior high school in Olyphant and grades K-3 were Mid Valley Primary Center, housed in the remaining school building in Dickson City.

The land chosen for the new district building was, at the time a rather remote section of Throop which was mostly wooded which allowed for expansion as a large parcel of land was bought by the district. Spartan Stadium, the track and football field, as well as an open sports field and baseball/softball fields were set up at the opposite end of the property from the new building, which was adjacent to Underwood Road. A field house was recently added to the sports complex.

Plans were made to build another building to house both the primary and intermediate students on the district land adjacent to the Secondary Center. The new building was opened for the start of the 1989–1990 school year for students in grades K-6.

1989 to present 
Due to increases in student population from recent housing developments, the elementary school building was expanded in the early 1990s. Mid Valley Secondary Center was expanded in the early 2000s

Extracurriculars
Mid Valley School District offers a variety of clubs, activities and an extensive sports program.

Athletics
Mid Valley Secondary Center has teams in the following areas:  

Football – Varsity and freshman teams. All freshmen play on the freshman team, who are then encouraged to join the varsity team for their sophomore year. 
Cross country – Varsity and junior high. The varsity team is considered all the high school students (grade 9 – 12), the junior high team historically has been grades 7 and 8. 
Soccer – originally introduced with a co-ed team, there are now separate teams for boys and girls. 
Golf
Basketball – For boys, the set up is similar to the football team with a separate freshman team, additionally teams exist for 7th and 8th grade boys. For girls, one team exists for high school students and separate teams for junior high and elementary students. The Mid Valley boys varsity team won the Pete Turonis championship for the first time in 29 years. 
Baseball - Varsity, freshman and junior high teams
Softball - Varsity, junior varsity and junior high teams 
Track and field – Varsity and junior high teams for both genders 
Tennis – Varsity teams for both genders. Females play in the fall and males play in the spring
Cheerleading

The historic rivals of the Mid Valley Spartans are the neighboring Valley View Cougars. An unofficial rivalry also exists with Holy Cross High School. During football season or when a team advances in the playoffs it is common to see the downtowns of all three towns adorned with blue and white ribbons and "Luv Ya Spartans" signs in business windows.

Student activities 

The student paper for the Secondary Center is The Spartan Outlook and is staffed by high school students in journalism electives. Other popular student activities at the secondary center include Leo Club, Mock Trial, Spartan Pride (equivalent to a booster club), National Honors Society, student council, drama, and yearbook. The Mid Valley Drama Club presents full-scaled musicals.  

Additionally, a statistically large number of students enter the Pennsylvania Junior Academy of Science Competition and compete at both the regional and state level.

References

External links 
 Mid Valley School District http://www.mvsd.us
 Mid Valley Spartans http://mvspartans.com

School districts established in 1969
School districts in Lackawanna County, Pennsylvania
1969 establishments in Pennsylvania